The 1978–79 QMJHL season was the tenth season in the history of the Quebec Major Junior Hockey League. The QMJHL unveils a new logo for its tenth anniversary, using the letters of league's French acronym shaped as an ice skate. Ten teams played 72 games each in the schedule. The Trois-Rivières Draveurs finished first overall in the regular season winning their second consecutive Jean Rougeau Trophy, and defended their President's Cup title defeating the Sherbrooke Castors in the finals.

Team changes
 The Shawinigan Dynamos are renamed the Shawinigan Cataractes.

Final standings
Note: GP = Games played; W = Wins; L = Losses; T = Ties; Pts = Points; GF = Goals for; GA = Goals against

complete list of standings.

Scoring leaders
Note: GP = Games played; G = Goals; A = Assists; Pts = Points; PIM = Penalties in minutes

 complete scoring statistics

Playoffs
J. F. Sauve was the leading scorer of the playoffs with 38 points (19 goals, 19 assists).

Quarterfinals
 Trois-Rivières Draveurs defeated Shawinigan Cataractes 4 games to 0.
 Sherbrooke Castors defeated Chicoutimi Saguenéens 4 games to 0.
 Verdun Éperviers defeated Cornwall Royals 4 games to 3.
 Montreal Juniors defeated Quebec Remparts 4 games to 2.

Semifinals
 Trois-Rivières Draveurs defeated Montreal Juniors 4 games to 1.
 Sherbrooke Castors defeated Verdun Éperviers 4 games to 0.

Finals
 Trois-Rivières Draveurs defeated Sherbrooke Castors 4 games to 0.

All-star teams
First team
 Goaltender - Jacques Cloutier, Trois-Rivières Draveurs 
 Left defence - Pierre Lacroix, Trois-Rivières Draveurs
 Right defence - Ray Bourque, Verdun Éperviers
 Left winger - Louis Begin, Sherbrooke Castors
 Centreman - Normand Aubin, Verdun Éperviers
 Right winger - Jimmy Mann, Sherbrooke Castors 
 Coach - Michel Bergeron, Trois-Rivières Draveurs
Second team
 Goaltender - Vincent Tremblay, Quebec Ramparts 
 Left defence - Kevin Lowe, Quebec Remparts
 Right defence - Michel Leblanc, Trois-Rivières Draveurs 
 Left winger - Gilles Hamel, Trois-Rivières Draveurs 
 Centreman - J. F. Sauve, Trois-Rivières Draveurs
 Right winger - Denis Cyr, Montreal Juniors
 Coach - Ron Racette, Quebec Remparts
 List of First/Second/Rookie team all-stars.

Trophies and awards
Team
President's Cup - Playoff Champions, Trois-Rivières Draveurs.
Jean Rougeau Trophy - Regular Season Champions, Trois-Rivières Draveurs.
Robert Lebel Trophy - Team with best GAA, Trois-Rivières Draveurs.

Player
Michel Brière Memorial Trophy - Most Valuable Player, Pierre Lacroix, Trois-Rivières Draveurs.
Jean Béliveau Trophy - Top Scorer, J. F. Sauve, Trois-Rivières Draveurs.
Guy Lafleur Trophy - Playoff MVP, J. F. Sauve, Trois-Rivières Draveurs.
Jacques Plante Memorial Trophy - Best GAA, Jacques Cloutier, Trois-Rivières Draveurs.
Emile Bouchard Trophy - Defenceman of the Year, Ray Bourque, Verdun Éperviers.
Michel Bergeron Trophy - Rookie of the Year, Alain Grenier, Laval National .
Frank J. Selke Memorial Trophy - Most sportsmanlike player, Ray Bourque, Verdun Éperviers, and J. F. Sauve, Trois-Rivières Draveurs.

See also
1979 Memorial Cup
1979 NHL Entry Draft
1978–79 OMJHL season
1978–79 WHL season

References
 Official QMJHL Website
 www.hockeydb.com/

Quebec Major Junior Hockey League seasons
QMJHL